Təpəcənnət (also, Dara-Dzhanatly and Deredzhannetli) is a village and municipality in the Shaki Rayon of Azerbaijan.  It has a population of 590.  The municipality consists of the villages of Təpəcənnət and Kəhrizoba.

References 

Populated places in Shaki District